The Aachen Formation is an Upper Cretaceous geologic formation in the southern Netherlands and northeastern Belgium and adjacent Germany.

It is stratigraphically equivalent to the middle part of the Chalk Group of England, and named after the German city of Aachen.

Geography 
The formation crops out in southern Belgian and Dutch Limburg and adjacent areas in Germany. The formation can also be found in the subsurface of West Flanders, where it forms an aquifer from which drinking water is won.

Geology 
The Aachen Formation consists of glauconite bearing sand. It was deposited during the Santonian and Campanian ages (85.8 to 70.6 million years ago) of the Cretaceous Period.

The formation rests unconformably on top of Carboniferous rocks of the Limburg Group, which are more than three times as old. Overlying the Aachen Formation is the Vaals Formation, equivalent to the upper part of the Chalk Group of England.

Fossil content 
Among others, the following fossils have been reported from the formation:

Corals 
 Cunnolites cancellata

Flora 
 Aachenosaurus multidens
Pollen

 Chrysotheca dentata
 Chrysotheca quadriplicata
 Chrysotheca striata
 Chrysotheca tenuis
 Geleenites fascinus
 Spherites spinosus
 Triletes aachenensis
 Triletes carbunculus
 Triletes compositi-punctatus
 Triletes cristatus
 Triletes diktyotus
 Triletes dubius
 Triletes lobatus
 Triletes minimus
 Triletes nanus
 Triletes occultatus
 Triletes persimilis
 Triletes pupus
 Triletes tenellus

See also 

 List of stratigraphic units in the Netherlands
 List of fossiliferous stratigraphic units in the Netherlands
 List of fossiliferous stratigraphic units in Belgium
 List of fossiliferous stratigraphic units in Germany

References

Bibliography 

 
 
 
 

Geologic formations of Germany
Geologic formations of Belgium
Geologic formations of the Netherlands
Upper Cretaceous Series of Europe
Cretaceous Germany
Cretaceous Netherlands
Mesozoic Belgium
Campanian Stage
Santonian Stage
Sandstone formations
Shallow marine deposits
Paleontology in Belgium
Paleontology in the Netherlands
Formations
Formations
Formations